Hollowayana is a genus of tiger moths in the family Erebidae. The genus contains only one species, Hollowayana landaca (Moore, 1859), which is found in Java, Bali, and Flores.

References
 , 2006: Hollowayana, a new genus for Arctia landaca Moore, 1859 and Diacrisia sumatrensis javanica Rothschild, 1910 (Lepidoptera, Arctiidae) from Java. Tinea 19 (2): 104-108, Tokyo.
Natural History Museum Lepidoptera generic names catalog

Spilosomina
Monotypic moth genera
Moths of Oceania